Ivan Alekseyevich Tarasov (born 30 January 2000) is a Russian football player.

Club career
He made his debut in the Russian Football National League for FC Zenit-2 Saint Petersburg on 29 July 2018 in a game against FC Luch Vladivostok.

On 25 February 2019, he joined Finnish club HJK on loan.

References

External links
 

2000 births
Footballers from Saint Petersburg
Living people
Russian footballers
Association football forwards
Russia youth international footballers
FC Zenit-2 Saint Petersburg players
Helsingin Jalkapalloklubi players
Klubi 04 players
FC SKA-Khabarovsk players
FC Zenit Saint Petersburg players
Russian First League players
Russian Second League players
Veikkausliiga players
Kakkonen players
Russian expatriate footballers
Expatriate footballers in Finland
Russian expatriate sportspeople in Finland